The 2015 East Dorset District Council election took place on 7 May 2015 in order to elect members of the East Dorset District Council in Dorset, England. The whole council was up for election after boundary changes reduced the number of seats by seven. The Conservative Party stayed in overall control of the council.

Background
Before the election, the Conservatives controlled the council with 30 councillors, whilst the Liberal Democrats with just six seats were the only other party on the council. However, in December 2014 the former leader of Dorset County Council councillor Spencer Flower was suspended from the Conservative Party after being charged by police and both Flower and his wife Toni Coombs stood for re-election as independents at the 2015 election. As they were the only candidates in Verwood West ward they were elected without opposition.

In three other wards, Crane, Handley Vale and Verwood East, the Conservative candidates were also unopposed. This meant 12 wards had elections in 2015 with a total of 66 candidates contesting them.

Boundary changes since the last election in 2011 reduced the number of councillors from 36 to 29. These changes also reduced the number of wards to 16, with four wards electing three councillors, five electing two and seven electing one.

Election result
The Conservatives remained in control of the council with 24 of the 29 seats. The only three contested seats that were not won by the Conservatives, were won by the Liberal Democrats, who won both seats in Wimborne Minster, as well as one seat in Colehill East.

Ward results

By-elections between 2015 and 2019

References

East Dorset District Council elections
2015 English local elections
May 2015 events in the United Kingdom
2010s in Dorset